College Kumar may refer to:
 College Kumar (2017 film), an Indian Kannada-language romantic comedy film
 College Kumar (2020 film), an Indian comedy film